Nicolás Julián Katz (born 13 January 1998) is an Argentine professional footballer who plays as a forward for Olimpo.

Club career
Bella Vista were Katz's first youth team, preceding future stints with Olimpo and Estudiantes. After a spell with the latter, he rejoined Olimpo who would later give him his start in senior football. Having been on the substitutes bench twice as the club were relegated from the 2017–18 Primera División, Katz made his professional bow in the following campaign during a Copa Argentina tie with Gimnasia y Esgrima on 29 July 2018. His first appearance in league football arrived in Olimpo's Primera B Nacional opener against Sarmiento.

International career
In 2014, Katz received a call-up to train with the Argentina U17s.

Career statistics
.

References

External links

1998 births
Living people
Sportspeople from Bahía Blanca
Argentine footballers
Association football forwards
Primera Nacional players
Olimpo footballers